The Bureau is a French drama series which first aired on Canal+ and in France was titled Le Bureau des Légendes.

Based on real accounts by former spies and inspired by contemporary events, The Bureau centres on the daily life and missions of spies within the DGSE (General Directorate for External Security - the French equivalent of the United States's CIA or the UK's MI6), and its department in charge of most undercover agents, known as the Bureau of Legends. Working in key locations around the world and living under false identities (or 'legends') for years, these agents' missions are to identify potential sources.

The series focuses on French intelligence officer Guillaume "Malotru" Debailly (Matthieu Kassovitz), who returns to the French capital after six years undercover in Syria. He has to face the challenge of reconnecting with his daughter, his ex-wife, colleagues and even his old self. But his return to 'normal life' proves difficult, especially when he is informed that Nadia, his lover in Damascus, is also in Paris. For love, he is willing to take risks for himself and the Bureau.

Series overview

Episodes

Season 1 (2015)

Season 2 (2016)
The series was the best performing new drama on the French premium pay net since Les Revenants in 2012. It was therefore quickly renewed for a second season. Shooting started in September 2015 and ended in February 2016. The series was broadcast on Canal+ in May 2016.

Season 3 (2017)

Season 4 (2018)

Season 5 (2020)

References

External links 

 

Lists of French television series episodes